Edwin John "Ted" Hook  (3 April 19102 April 1990) was a senior Australian public servant best known for his time as Secretary of the Attorney-General's Department in the 1960s.

Life and career
Ted Hook was born to English-born parents in Forest Lodge, Sydney on 3 April 1910.

In 1951 Hook joined the Attorney-General's Department. He was promoted quickly in the Department, and took a key role in the development and passage of several major pieces of legislation, including the Marriage Act 1961, and major amendments to the Crimes Act 1914. Between February 1964 and February 1970, Hook was Secretary of the Attorney-General's Department.

Hook retired from the Australian Public Service in 1970 after suffering a stress-related illness.

Hook died on 2 April 1990 in Benowa, Queensland.

Awards
Hook was made a Commander of the Order of the British Empire for service as Secretary of the Attorney-General's Department in January 1967.

References

1910 births
1990 deaths
Australian public servants
Australian Commanders of the Order of the British Empire